Kelly Jones (born 3 June 1974) is a Welsh singer-songwriter and a founding member, lead singer, and guitarist of the rock band Stereophonics.

Early life and debut
Kelly Jones was born the youngest of three boys to Beryl and Arwyn Jones in the small Welsh former mining village of Cwmaman, Rhondda Cynon Taf, spending his childhood with them and his two older brothers, Kevin and Lee.

Both of his parents worked in factories. His father coached youth football and pursued his own singing career. The name of Arwyn's backing band, Oscar and the Kingfishers, earned him the nickname 'Oscar' among friends and family. He went on to secure a record deal with Polydor, who renamed him 'Arwyn Davidson' due to the sheer number of Joneses in the music business at the time. Despite making multiple recordings, sharing the Hollies' manager and supporting slots with the likes of Roy Orbison, Arwyn had minimal mainstream success and only released a few singles (including a cover of the Graham Nash song "Simple Man").

During Jones' youth his uncle, a boxing referee, got him interested in the sport, and he later competed at a high level in South Wales. Following this Jones moved onto football, where he played for his county. Jones grew up in the village of Cwmaman, near Aberdare, where he became friends with neighbours, Stuart Cable and Richard Jones, with whom he formed, in 1992, one of a string of covers bands.

Jones' talent for writing was apparent in his youth. He studied film at college and considered becoming a scriptwriter – attracting interest from the BBC for his work – before focusing on music. As his band progressed from covers to performing original material, Jones brought his gift for narrative to his lyrics. He also flirted with the idea of career in boxing, and was a successful fighter at junior levels.

There is a strong autobiographical thread to Jones' writing on Stereophonics' 1997 debut album, Word Gets Around, including an account of his teenage years working on a market stall, "More Life in a Tramps Vest".

Career

In 1996, after several years on the south Wales live circuit, Stereophonics were the first band to be signed to Richard Branson's new Virgin Records label V2. Their debut EP Looks Like Chaplin was not pressed in enough numbers to qualify for the charts, and their next single Local Boy in the Photograph peaked one place shy of the UK Top 50. However, their debut LP Word Gets Around, helped by a busy touring schedule that included a support slot on fellow Welsh band Manic Street Preachers' 1996–97 tour, peaked at number 6 on the UK Albums Chart.

In January 2005, Kelly Jones performed a solo set at the Tsunami Relief Cardiff charity concert at the Millennium Stadium in Cardiff.

Other projects 
In 2007, Jones released his first solo album, Only the Names Have Been Changed, as a limited edition, which managed to reach number 1 on the iTunes download chart. He explained: "We were recording the sixth Stereophonics album last year and in-between takes I started doing these songs off the cuff. Three or four tracks in, I realised that this could actually be something [...] strange how it's always little things that makes big things happen." This created speculation that Jones would leave Stereophonics to pursue his solo career; however, he denied this.

Influences and musical style 
Jones is influenced by musicians such as Neil Young, Bob Dylan, Otis Redding, Stevie Wonder, Led Zeppelin, AC/DC and the Sex Pistols. He is noted for his raspy voice, which has been described as "whiskey" and has drawn criticism as well as acclaim.

Controversy 
Jones has had a troubled relationship with the national tabloid press and they have often criticised him, his contribution to music, and his vocal abilities. Jones has generated headlines several times by criticising fellow Britpop and post-Britpop musical artists, most notably Radiohead frontman and solo artist Thom Yorke. Jones criticised Yorke's attitude in a 2002 interview due to what he felt was complaining about touring on Radiohead's 1998 home video release, Meeting People Is Easy. He said: "We can all relate to that video – y'know, having to do a hundred fucking idents for radio stations – but that doesn't mean you've got to walk around and be a miserable twat to everybody. Which is what Thom Yorke is mostly." He later expressed regret for this comment, since he was a fan of Yorke.

Jones is known for his cynical view of manufactured pop and has also criticised reality shows such as Popstars and The X Factor, as well as manufactured bands such as Hear'Say.

Personal life

Jones and his first girlfriend were together for almost 12 years and had become engaged but split up. In 2002, Jones, drunk, vandalised the house and car of a friend because Jones had discovered the friend was courting his ex-girlfriend. Jones was arrested, but his friend did not press charges. Jones wrote the song "Rainbows and Pots of Gold" in response to the event. Jones and Rebecca Walters had two children, but they split shortly after the birth of the second child. Jones then married MTV journalist Jakki Healy, and they have two children, Riley and Marley.

Discography

Studio albums

Live albums

References

External links

1974 births
Living people
Welsh operatic baritones
Welsh rock singers
British rock singers
Welsh rock musicians
Welsh songwriters
21st-century Welsh male singers
Welsh guitarists
People from Aberdare
Welsh rock guitarists
Welsh singer-songwriters
Lead guitarists
21st-century British guitarists
British male singer-songwriters